Presles is a village of Wallonia and a district of the municipality of Aiseau-Presles, located in the province of Hainaut, Belgium.

Postal area: 6250 (old zone 6072) 
District: Charleroi

The village has a Walloon language theatre company, Les Nerviens (meaning Nervian in English).

History
The assumption a long time was put forth that the battle of Julius Caesar against the Nervians would have occurred in Presles, which was cancelled in around 1940.

Former municipalities of Hainaut (province)